Sirgala training area is one of the six military training fields used by the Estonian Defence Forces.

Establishment 
The training area is a reforested oil-shale mining area, which is largely administered by the State Forest Management Center. Sirgala training area was established on 12 June 2008, with Government Order No. 272 "Establishment of the Defense Forces Sirgala training area."

See also 
Keskpolügoon

References 

Military installations of Estonia
Ida-Viru County